Thomas Martyn (born 4 June 1971) is a former Ireland international rugby league footballer who played in the 1980s, 1990s and 2000s, and coached in the 2000s. Martyn was known for his very good passing ability and vision. He was able to enjoy a successful rugby career despite undergoing two knee reconstructions.

Background
Martyn was born in Leigh, Lancashire, England.

Playing career
The son of the rugby league footballer Tommy Martyn Sr, and the nephew of the Leigh and Great Britain rugby league footballer Mick Martyn,
Martyn played for St Helens from the interchange bench in their 1996 Challenge Cup Final victory over Bradford Bulls. Tommy Martyn, Jr. teamed up with Bobbie Goulding in the halves for the 1997 Challenge Cup Final at Wembley. His two tries and try-saving ankle tap tackle on Danny Peacock helped St. Helens to victory and earned him the Lance Todd Trophy as man-of-the-match. Martyn played for St. Helens at scrum half back in their 1999 Super League Grand Final victory over Bradford Bulls.

Having won the 1999 Super League Grand Final, St. Helens contested in the 2000 World Club Challenge against National Rugby League Premiers Melbourne, with Martyn playing as a stand-off half back in the loss. He also played for St. Helens at stand-off half back in their 2000 Super League Grand Final victory over Wigan. In 2000, Martyn's abilities were rewarded when he was selected to represent Ireland in the 2000 Rugby League World Cup. As Super League V champions, St. Helens played against 2000 NRL Premiers, Brisbane in the 2001 World Club Challenge. Martyn played at stand-off half back in St. Helens' victory.

Having won Super League VI, St Helens contested the 2003 World Club Challenge against 2002 NRL Premiers, Sydney Roosters. Martyn played at scrum half back in St. Helens' 38-0 loss.

Post playing
In 2008 he joined the coaching staff of Super League side Warrington, to act as a kicking coach for the academy side.

In December 2009 he joined Widnes in a similar role.

Martyn's son Shay Martyn is a professional rugby league footballer who plays for St Helens in the Betfred Super League.

References

External links
 Statistics at saints.org.uk
 Ireland 2000 RLWC squad 

1971 births
Living people
English people of Irish descent
English rugby league coaches
English rugby league players
Ireland national rugby league team players
Lance Todd Trophy winners
Leigh Leopards coaches
Leigh Leopards players
Oldham R.L.F.C. players
Rugby league five-eighths
Rugby league players from Leigh, Greater Manchester
St Helens R.F.C. players